Gregor Helfenstein (1559–1632) was a Roman Catholic prelate who served as Auxiliary Bishop of Trier (1599–1632).

Biography
Gregor Helfenstein was born in the village of Oberemmel, near Konz, Germany in 1559. On 29 Oct 1599, he was appointed during the papacy of Pope Clement VIII as Auxiliary Bishop of Trier and Titular Bishop of Azotus.  On 1 Nov 1599, was consecrated bishop by Ottavio Paravicini, Cardinal-Priest of Sant'Alessio. He served as Auxiliary Bishop of Trier until his death on 21 Oct 1632.

Episcopal succession
While bishop, he was the principal co-consecrator of:
Lothar von Metternich, Archbishop of Trier (1600);
Johann Schweikard von Kronberg, Archbishop of Mainz (1604);
Philipp Christoph von Sötern, Coadjutor Bishop of Speyer (1612); and
Wilhelm von Essern (Effern), Bishop of Worms (1612).

References 

16th-century Roman Catholic bishops in the Holy Roman Empire
17th-century Roman Catholic bishops in the Holy Roman Empire
Bishops appointed by Pope Clement VIII
1559 births
1632 deaths